Jack Iroga (born September 29, 1986) is a sprinter from the Solomon Islands.

Achievements

External links
 

1986 births
Living people
Solomon Islands male sprinters
Athletes (track and field) at the 2006 Commonwealth Games
Athletes (track and field) at the 2010 Commonwealth Games
Commonwealth Games competitors for the Solomon Islands